Kamukumchery is a village located in Pathanapuram in Kollam district of Kerala, India. The village belongs to the Piravanthoor and Thalavor panchayats. The Kallada River passes through the village. The main temple in Kamukumchery is Kamukumchery Thiruvilangonappan Temple. There are three schools which helped Kamukumchery to achieve 100% literacy: Government LPS Kamukumchery, Government New LPS Kamukumchery and UPS Kamukumchery.

References

Villages in Kollam district